Rehana Sunder is a Bahraini badminton player. Partnered with Heri Setiawan in the mixed doubles event, they reach the final round at the 2012 Bahrain International Challenge tournament, the two finished as a runner-up after defeated by the Indian pair Tanveer Gill and Mohita Sahdev in three-game with the score 11–21, 21–17, 14–21. In 2014, she and Setiawan also through to the final at the Bahrain International Series. The Austrian pair ended their hopes as a top seeded to win the title after lose in straight games.

Achievements

BWF International Challenge/Series
Mixed Doubles

 BWF International Challenge tournament
 BWF International Series tournament
 BWF Future Series tournament

References

External links
 

Living people
Place of birth missing (living people)
Bahraini female badminton players
1990 births